Catherine Townsend Johnson (November 29, 1904 – November 17, 1975) was an American stage and film actress.

Family
Johnson was born in Mount Vernon, New York. Her father was architect Thomas R. Johnson, who worked in the firm of Cass Gilbert, the architect of several noteworthy buildings in New York City, including the Woolworth Building, the New York Customs House, and many library buildings. When she was a junior, she dropped out of Grew Seminary to study at the American Academy of Dramatic Arts.

Career

Stage
Johnson's professional acting debut was in Beggar on Horseback, and she acted in R.U.R. in Chicago. She moved to California after appearing in The Little Accident in Providence, Rhode Island. She was accompanied by her soon-to-be husband John Cromwell, who worked as a director in Hollywood. 

Johnson's Broadway credits included State of the Union (1945), A Free Soul (1928), Crime (1927), No Trespassing (1926), One of the Family (1925), All Dressed Up (1925), The Morning After (1925), Beggar on Horseback (1925), Beggar on Horseback (1924), and Go West, Young Man (1923).

Films
Johnson was signed to a contract with Metro-Goldwyn-Mayer by Cecil B. DeMille following a performance of The Silver Cord at the Repertory Theater in Los Angeles, California. The play was produced by Simeon Gest of the Figueroa Playhouse. Her film debut came in Dynamite (1929), written by Jeanie Macpherson and featuring Charles Bickford and Conrad Nagel.  Production was delayed while Johnson recovered from an appendectomy.

She went on to appear in The Ship from Shanghai (1930), This Mad World (1930),  Billy the Kid (1930), The Spoilers (1930) with Gary Cooper and Betty Compson, DeMille's Madam Satan (1930), Passion Flower (1930), Capra's American Madness (1932), Thirteen Women (1932), Of Human Bondage (which starred Leslie Howard and Bette Davis), Jalna (1935) and Mr. Lucky (1943). Johnson was cast opposite Warner Baxter in a screen adaptation of Such Men Are Dangerous by Elinor Glyn. The story was adapted to the screen by Fox Film.

Johnson's final film appearance was in the 1954 British film Jivaro (also known as Lost Treasure of the Amazon).

Personal life and death
Johnson married actor, director, and producer John Cromwell, and they had a son, actor James Cromwell. Johnson and Cromwell divorced. 

On November 17, 1975, Johnson died from a heart attack at her home in Waterford, Connecticut.

Partial filmography

 Dynamite (1929) as Cynthia Crothers
 The Ship from Shanghai (1930) as Dorothy Daley
 This Mad World (1930) as Victoria
 The Spoilers (1930) as Helen Chester
 Madam Satan (1930) as Angela Brooks/Madame Satan
 Billy the Kid (1930) as Claire Randall
 Passion Flower (1930) as Katherine Pringle 'Cassy' Wallace
 The Single Sin (1931) as Kate Adams
 The Spy (1931) as Anna Turin
 American Madness (1932) as Mrs. Phyllis Dickson
 Thirteen Women (1932) as Helen Dawson Frye
 Eight Girls in a Boat (1934) as Hannah
 This Girl Is Mine (1934) as Bee McCrea
 Of Human Bondage (1934) as Norah
 Their Big Moment (1934) as Eve Farrington
 Village Tale (1935) as Janet Stevenson
 Jalna (1935) as Alayne Archer Whiteoak
 White Banners (1938) as Mrs. Marcia Ward
 The Real Glory (1939) as Mrs. Mable Manning
 Son of Fury: The Story of Benjamin Blake (1942) as Helena Blake
 Mr. Lucky (1943) as Mrs. Mary Ostrander
 The Adventures of Mark Twain (1944) as Jane Clemens (uncredited)
 Jivaro (1954) as Umari

Notes
 
 Los Angeles Times, "Demille Features Child Actor", January 17, 1929, Page A10.
 Los Angeles Times, "Kay Johnson Under Knife", March 3, 1929, Page C15.
 Los Angeles Times, "Kay Johnson Continues", May 30, 1929, Page A6.
 Los Angeles Times, "Kay Johnson, as Genteel Heroine of Cecil B. DeMille, Plays First Screen Role", July 21, 1929, Page B13.

External links

1904 births
1975 deaths
20th-century American actresses
Actresses from New York (state)
American Academy of Dramatic Arts alumni
American film actresses
American stage actresses
People from Waterford, Connecticut
Actors from Mount Vernon, New York